The Parliament of Zimbabwe is the bicameral legislature of Zimbabwe composed of the Senate and the National Assembly. The Senate is the upper house, and consists of 80 members, 60 of whom are elected by proportional representation from ten six-member constituencies corresponding to the country's provinces. Of the remaining 20 seats, 18 are reserved for chiefs, and two for people with disabilities. The National Assembly is the lower house, and consists of 270 members. Of these, 210 are elected from single-member constituencies. The remaining 60 seats are reserved for women, and are elected by proportional representation from ten six-member constituencies corresponding to the country's provinces.

Formerly based at Parliament House, Harare, the parliament will move to the New Zimbabwe Parliament Building in 2022. The new building has 650 seats, which will allow the parliament to expand.

History 
Historically, the first legislature in what is now Zimbabwe was the Southern Rhodesian Legislative Council, established in 1898 in what was then the British South Africa Company territory of Southern Rhodesia. Company rule in Rhodesia ended in 1923 when the territory became a self-governing colony, and the Legislative Council was replaced by the Southern Rhodesian Legislative Assembly. In 1970, five years after the colony's Unilateral Declaration of Independence, Rhodesia replaced the unicameral Legislative Assembly with a bicameral Parliament, consisting of a Senate and House of Assembly. This parliamentary structure was retained upon Zimbabwe's independence in 1980. Per the constitution produced by Lancaster House Agreement in 1979, the Senate was composed of 40 seats and the House of Assembly was composed of 100, with ten Senate seats and 20 seats in the House of Assembly reserved for white Zimbabweans. The white-reserved seats were abolished in 1987, and a constitutional amendment in 1989 abolished the Senate and expanded the House of Assembly to 120 seats. In 2005, the Senate was reintroduced and the House of Assembly expanded. The House of Assembly was expanded once again in 2007 to 210 seats. The present parliamentary structure has been in place since the adoption of a new constitution in 2013.

The Senate is presided over by its President (see list of presidents of the Senate), who is assisted by a Deputy President. The National Assembly is presided over by a Speaker, who is not a Member of Parliament. The Speaker is assisted by a Deputy Speaker. The 9th Parliament of Zimbabwe is the current Parliament since the 2018 general election. The Zimbabwe African National Union – Patriotic Front, the ruling party since Zimbabwe's independence in 1980, holds supermajorities in both chambers of Parliament. The Movement for Democratic Change holds most of the remaining seats, and forms the opposition.

See also

Elections in Zimbabwe
Politics of Zimbabwe

References

External links
Zimbabwe Parliament Website

Government of Zimbabwe
Zimbabwe
Zimbabwe
Zimbabwe